Angle of incidence is a measure of deviation of something from "straight on" and may refer to:

 Angle of incidence (aerodynamics), angle between a wing chord and the longitudinal axis, as distinct from angle of attack, which is relative to the airflow
 Angle of incidence (optics), describing the approach of a ray to a surface